is a professional footballer who plays as a winger for USL Championship club Detroit City. Born in England, he has represented Japan at the international youth level.

Club career

Youth career at Tottenham Hotspur
Born in London, England, Goodard joined Tottenham Hotspur Academy as a first year scholar. He spent five years developing at the U18 and U21 sides. At the end of the 2014–15 season, Goddard extended his contract with the club. In July 2017, it was reported that Goddard did not join the club's first team for the USA tour squad; it came after when he turned down the contract extension from Tottenham Hotspur and seek to leave the club.

Benevento Calcio
In August 2018, Goddard joined Serie B side Benevento on a three-year contract. On 18 November 2018, Goddard made his senior debut, as an 82nd-minute substitute in a 3–1 loss to Spezia. Goddard spent most of the season on the substitute bench, as he made two appearances for the side in his first season at Benevento Calcio.

Loan Spells from Benevento Calcio
On 1 September 2019, Goddard joined Cypriot First Division club Pafos. It was later revealed to be a loan deal. He made his debut for the club, coming on as an 82nd-minute substitute, in a 2–0 lost against AEL Limassol on 4 November 2019. Goddard made eight appearances for Pafos in all competitions, as the league was abandoned due to COVID-19 pandemic.

On 3 October 2020, Goddard joined Indian Super League club Mumbai City on a year-long loan deal. He made his debut for the club, coming on as a 58th-minute substitute, in a 1–0 loss against NorthEast United on 21 November 2020. On 24 February 2021, Goddard scored his first goal in his professional career, in a 6–1 win against Odisha. With Mumbai, he helped Mumbai win the double, as they won both the League Winners Shield and the Play-offs. At the end of the 2020–21 season, Goddard made nineteen appearances and scoring once in all competitions.

Central Coast Mariners
Goddard signed a two-year deal with A-League side Central Coast Mariners in August 2021. Upon joining the club, he revealed that his then Mumbai City teammate Adam Le Fondre helped him make a move to Central Coast Mariners.

Goddard made his debut for the club in the opening game of the season against Newcastle Jets and set up the second goal of the game, in a 2–1 win. On 18 December 2021, he scored his second goal for Central Coast Mariners, in a 2–0 win against Western Sydney Wanderers.

Detroit City
On 26 July 2022, Goddard joined second-tier US side Detroit City who compete in the USL Championship.

International career
Born in London to an English father and Japanese mother, Goddard has represented Japan at the under-16 and under-17 levels.

Personal life
Regarding his nationality, Goddard said: "I have never really wanted to play for England. Always my mindset was that I wanted to play for Japan. Since I was 10, it's always been an ambition of mine. If they keep progressing as quickly, then they will be better than England and a lot of nations in the future. I think a lot of the boys [in this country's youth system] are also looking elsewhere rather than England. A lot of people in the youth system are not really admiring the England team and the English way of playing football. For me, I have always pictured myself playing for Japan." He said he does not speak Japanese, but is taking lessons twice a week.

Career statistics

Club

Honours

Club
Mumbai City FC
 Indian Super League: 2020–21
 Indian Super League Premiers: 2020–21

See also
List of Central Coast Mariners FC players
List of foreign A-League Men players
List of foreign Serie B players

References

External links

1997 births
Living people
Association football midfielders
Footballers from Greater London
Japanese footballers
Japan youth international footballers
English footballers
Japanese people of English descent
English people of Japanese descent
Serie B players
Indian Super League players
USL Championship players
Benevento Calcio players
Pafos FC players
Mumbai City FC players
Central Coast Mariners FC players
Detroit City FC players
English expatriate footballers
English expatriate sportspeople in Italy
Expatriate footballers in Italy
English expatriate sportspeople in Cyprus
Expatriate footballers in Cyprus
English expatriate sportspeople in India
Expatriate footballers in India
English expatriate sportspeople in the United States
Expatriate soccer players in the United States